SH2 domain containing 3C, also known as SH2D3C, is a protein that in humans is encoded by the SH2D3C gene.

Function 

Sh2d3c is a gene on human chromosome 9 that encodes an SH2 domain containing protein known as NSP3.  The mouse homologue is found on chromosome 2.  The NSP (Novel SH2-containing Protein) family of proteins contains three members, NSP1, NSP2, and NSP3 (this protein), all of which have a similar architecture, with an N-terminal SH2 domain, a proline serine rich region, which contains consensus sequences for MAP kinase substrates, and a conserved C-terminus, which binds to the Cas family of adapter proteins, and also shows homology to GEF domains.

NSP3 was originally identified by three independent groups of researchers.  The mouse homologue of NSP3 has been shown to have two distinct isoforms, generated by alternative splicing, that are expressed in different tissues.  The shorter isoform, known as Chat (Cas/Hef1 associated signal transducer) is expressed in brain, lung, heart, kidney, muscle, liver, and intestine, while the larger isoform, known as Chat-H (the "H" is for Hematopoietic), is expressed in spleen, thymus, and lymph nodes.  The two isoforms differ only in their N-terminus, which has been shown by one group to be important for membrane localization.

Through its interaction with Hef1, Chat-H, has been shown to be an important regulator of lymphocyte adhesion, acting upstream of Rap1 in the integrin activation pathway.

References

Further reading

External links